The names Blum (German short for Blume, "flower") and Bluma (Yiddish for "flower") may refer to:

Forename

Notable people with the forename include:
 Bluma Appel - a Canadian philanthropist and patron of the arts
 Bluma Tischler
 Bluma Zeigarnik - a Soviet psychologist and psychiatrist

Surname

Notable people with the surname include:
 Dzintra Blūma - a Latvian slalom canoer
 Jesse Bluma - a renowned baker and blogger
 Jaime Bluma - a former Major League Baseball pitcher 
 Trevor Blumas - a Canadian television and film actor[1] and singer-songwriter

Places

 Blumau Formation (Blum ~ au "meadow") - a geologic formation in Austria
 Blumau-Neurißhof - a town in the district of Baden in Lower Austria

Other uses

 Blumaroo - a virtual pet from the website Neopets
 Blumarine - an Italian fashion house

See also
 Blumarten
 Bulma